The Boxcars were an American bluegrass band. In addition to being Grammy-nominated, the band has received numerous International Bluegrass Music Awards both as a group and individually.

History

The Boxcars were founded by Adam Steffey, Ron Stewart, Keith Garrett, John Bowman, and Harold Nixon. They released their debut self-titled album in 2010 and were nominated for numerous International Bluegrass Music Awards the year after. In 2014, Bowman left the group to focus on his career of preaching and singing in churches, releasing a solo album in June of that year. Bowman was replaced by Gary Hultman in June 2014.

The group disbanded in 2017.

Discography

Awards and nominations

References

External links
 The Boxcars official website

American bluegrass music groups